Pingtan is a town in Dongxing District, Neijiang, Sichuan province, China. , it administers Pingtan Residential Community and the following nine villages: 
Chengxin Village
Shili Village
Qingliang Village
Lizi Village
Baijia Village
Baota Village
Shaiyu Village
Shuili Village
Lanjia Village

See also 
 List of township-level divisions of Sichuan

References 

Township-level divisions of Sichuan
Neijiang